The 2015 World Financial Group Continental Cup of Curling was held from January 8 to 11 at the Markin MacPhail Centre International Arena in Calgary, Alberta. The Continental Cup featured team events, mixed doubles events, singles competitions, and skins competitions, and the brunt of the points were in the skins competitions. TSN broadcast the event, as it has in previous years.

The total attendance for the event was 22,606. Team Canada collected CAD$52,000 winners cheque and CAD$13,000 skins bonus. Team Europe collected CAD$26,000 losers cheque.

Competition background
In their 2013-2014 Annual Review, the World Curling Federation reported that they can no longer justify further involvement in the Continental Cup, and that the Canadian Curling Association will operate the event starting in 2015.

This edition of the Continental Cup would be the first in which the new system of competing teams would be implemented. It was intended that in this and future editions of the Continental Cup, Team North America would be replaced by an all-Canadian team entry, where team Canada would compete alternatively against Team Europe in odd years and Team World, made up of teams from the United States and non-European curling nations, in even years. However, this format would only last for the 2015 event. In this edition of the Continental Cup, six teams from Canada competed against six teams from Europe.

The same competition format as that of the previous year was used. Out of the sixty total points available, a majority of points would be needed to win the cup. The mixed doubles, singles, and team games were worth one point each, and ties were worth one half point each to both teams. The skins games were worth a total of five points. Six mixed doubles and six singles games were played, along with eighteen team games and six skins games.

Teams
The teams will be selected from the top teams in each region. Six teams from each region will compete against each other in the competition. The teams from Canada earn the right to represent Team Canada by virtue of winning certain events, namely the Canada Cup of Curling and the Canadian National Championships (the Brier and the Tournament of Hearts). The final two teams are the teams who represented Canada at the 2014 Winter Olympics.

For Team Europe, the teams participating include Olympic bronze medallist Eve Muirhead, Olympic silver medallist Margaretha Sigfridsson, world bronze medallist Anna Sidorova, Olympic bronze medallist Niklas Edin, two-time world champion David Murdoch, and two-time European champion Thomas Ulsrud.

Events
All times listed are in Mountain Standard Time (UTC−7). The draws for Thursday, Friday, and Saturday were released on Wednesday night, and the draws for Sunday were released on Saturday afternoon.

Thursday, January 8

Draw 1
Team
8:30 am

Draw 2
Mixed doubles
1:30 pm

Draw 3
Team
6:30 pm

Friday, January 9

Draw 4
Team
8:30 am

Draw 5
Singles
1:30 pm

Draw 6
Team
6:30 pm

Saturday, January 10

Draw 7
Mixed doubles
10:00 am

Draw 8
Team
2:00 pm

Draw 9
Team
6:30 pm

Sunday, January 11

Draw 10
Skins
11:30 am

Draw 11
Skins
6:30 pm

Statistics
The statistics for team play, including team skins play, are listed below. The percentages are calculated for each player by rating their shots in each game. Each shot the player attempts is scored out of four based on how well the shot is made.

Player percentages

Men

Women

Team percentages

Men

Women

References

External links

Continental Cup of Curling
Continental Cup
Curling in Alberta
Sport in Calgary
Continental Cup
Continental Cup of Curling